Withings (pronounced "WITH-things") is a French consumer electronics company headquartered in Issy-les-Moulineaux, France. It also has offices in Boston, Massachusetts, USA, and Hong Kong, and distributes its products worldwide. Withings is known for design and innovation in connected  devices, such as the first Wi-Fi scale on the market (introduced in 2009), an FDA-cleared blood pressure monitor, a smart sleep system, and a line of automatic activity tracking watches. It also provides B2B solutions for healthcare providers and researchers. 

Withings was purchased by Finnish company Nokia on 26 April 2016 and became a division of Nokia known as Nokia Health. The Withings brand continued to be used until June 2017, when it was replaced by the Nokia brand. In May 2018, Éric Carreel, Withings' founder, finalized a deal to regain control and the company became independent again, under the Withings name.

History

Early history
Withings was founded in 2008 by three executives from the technology and telecom industries: Éric Carreel (CEO), who was co-founder of Inventel; Cédric Hutchings; and Fred Potter (CTO until 2011).

In September 2010, Withings received its first venture capital funding – $3.8 million from Ventech – to fund the development of the company's next two products. In January 2011, Withings announced at the Consumer Electronics Show in Las Vegas that its second product would be a blood pressure monitor that connects to the iPhone. It also announced it would produce a baby monitor for use with smartphones and other connected devices, which was made available to purchase across Europe in November 2011 and in the United States in February 2012.

Withings received a $30 million investment from Bpifrance, Idinvest Partners, 360 CapitalPartners, and Ventech in July 2013. The company integrated with Apple's HealthKit platform in October 2014. The compatibility across Withings' range of connected devices enabled the integration of personal data into the iOS Health app.

At WebSummit in Dublin, 2015, the company announced a partnership with MyFitnessPal. The partnership combined Withings' Health Mate app with MyFitnessPal's nutrition data to let the users know whether they were exercising enough in relation to their diet.

2016 to 2018; Acquisition by Nokia
In April 2016, Nokia announced it had struck a deal to acquire Withings and integrate it with the group's Nokia Technologies division. The deal closed on 31 May 2016. The CEO of Withings, Cédric Hutchings, became the leader of the new Digital Health business of Nokia Technologies. At the time of the acquisition, the Withings brand was said to continue to exist, at least for the time being; however, by the winter of 2016 the brand had already transitioned from the original "Withings Inspire Health" to "Withings Part of Nokia".

On 23 December 2016, Withings products were pulled from the Apple Store for unclear reasons, allegedly as an act of retaliation following the escalation of a patent dispute between Apple and Nokia. On February 26, 2017, it was announced that Withings would no longer be used as a brand: its devices would be sold under the Nokia brand. The rebranding was completed on June 20, 2017.

2018 to present; Purchase by Éric Carreel
On May 2, 2018, Nokia announced plans to sell its health tech business to Withings co-founder Éric Carreel. The sale was completed at the end of that month. Carreel had left Nokia in 2017 and completed the purchase of Withings later in 2018.

In April 2019, Withings announced that it had set up a factory in France.

Products

Smart watches and fitness trackers

Withings manufactures smart watches and fitness trackers, including the Activité, an activity tracking watch which was the first smartwatch to resemble a traditional wristwatch. It has no buttons and is controlled from a phone app, compatible with both iPhone and Android. It can track the user's sleep, swimming, walking and running automatically. It also incorporates weight, heart rate, and body mass data from Withings' wireless scales, like the Smart Body Analyzer.

The company also manufactures the Activité Steel which is made of stainless steel with chrome hands and a silicone strap. Other models include the Activité Sapphire and the Activité Pop. One of the users of Activité is former French president François Hollande.

Withings began selling its Pulse O2 in the summer of 2013. The product was upgraded in 2014 to include additional features such as the pulse oximetry measurement (SPO2) and the wear-it-your-way form factor, and the name was changed to Ox. The Pulse contains a pedometer, heart rate monitor and blood oxygen reader, and can connect to other Withings devices such as the Smart Body Analyzer scales and blood pressure monitor. The Pulse is the only such device that does reflexive measurement, so users do not need to clip their finger for the SPO2 measurement. Withings Go was released in 2016 and is an activity tracker that can be clipped or hung on belts, or worn on the wrist with a silicone strap. 

Withings' first product since being purchased by Carreel in 2019 is the Steel HR Sport smartwatch, a fitness tracker with the appearance of a watch. It is a hybrid and provides heart rate monitoring, GPS tracking, and fitness level analytics including oxygen intake sensors. It is the first Withings product to offer fitness level assessments. Withings also unveiled the Withings Move at CES 2019. This is an entry-level smartwatch with an ECG version that has embedded electrocardiogram tracking.

Scales

In 2009, Withings released a WiFi Body Scale which was the first connected body scale. It measures weight and fat mass and sends data to the user's app over Wi-Fi, and also connects to platforms such as Google Health and Microsoft HealthVault as well as diet and exercise sites such as DailyBurn. 

In 2012, Withings announced an internet-connected baby and toddler scale at the 2012 Consumer Electronics Show. It was the first scale of its kind and won a CES Innovations Award. 

It also produced the Withings Smart Body Analyzer, a smart scale that measures weight and calculates body mass index and fat mass. The scales received media attention when magician Penn Jillette, having lost nearly 120 pounds in four months to preserve his health, attributed his success to a strict regimen and the Withings smart scale.

Health monitors
 
In 2011, Withings released the first connected Blood Pressure Monitor, which was upgraded in March 2014 to a wireless version to connect to iOS and Android mobile devices. Approved by the FDA, the device allows patients to chart their blood pressure readings at home: it measures systolic and diastolic blood pressure as well as heart rate. The BPM Core, introduced in 2019, adds an ECG function and a digital stethoscope which listens for some heart valve defects.

Withings Thermo is a temporal artery thermometer which uses a 16-sensor array to deliver fast and accurate temperature readings. The thermometer displays the temperature, storing data to be analyzed and presented in the accompanying app. Its Wi-Fi and Bluetooth connectivity allows smartphone users to log readings, along with other information such as symptoms and medication. The device stores profiles of several people and lasts on two batteries for about two years. Thermo won two 2016 CES Innovation Awards (Best in Fitness, Sport and Biotech, and Tech for a Better World).

Health Mate app

Withings has a mobile application called Health Mate that connects with many of its devices and shows activity and sleep trends over time in graphs. The app also tracks weight, heart rate, blood pressure and more if the user enters the data or owns a Withings smart scale or blood pressure monitor. Health Mate can be integrated with Apple Watch.

Business-to-business products

In 2019, Withings launched a line of business-to-business products for healthcare professionals. Its Withings Med Pro Data allows third parties like healthcare providers collect data from Withings' products. Withings RPM (formerly Med Pro Care) is used to track the wellness of patients by healthcare providers.

Other products

Withings also produces Aura, a smart alarm clock with sensors, which has sleep programs to help induce sleep, and has light and sound programs to gently wake the user.

Withings previously produced a home monitoring system known as Withings Home, a product they later cancelled.

Research

Withings has an in-house research body, dedicated to accelerating the connected health revolution through a combination of in-house research and academic partnerships. Using real-time data, it tracks the extent to which key risk factors for heart disease are linked to lifestyle, such as sedentary behavior, overweight and obesity, and high blood pressure, and what steps can be taken to reduce risks. The Institute has published several research papers on various topics, and Withings products have been involved in numerous clinical trials.

See also
 Connected health
 Quantified Self

References 

Information technology companies of France
French companies established in 2008
Internet of things companies
Wearable devices
Home automation companies
2016 mergers and acquisitions
Fitness apps
Health software
Medical monitoring